John Kweku Danso (born 27 September 1944) is a Ghanaian politician and a member of the first Parliament of the fourth Republic representing the Sefwi-Wiawso constituency in the Western Region of Ghana. He represented the National Democratic Congress.

Early life and education 
John Kweku Danso was born on 27 September 1957 at Sefwi-Wiawso in the Western Region of Ghana. He attended the University of Cape Coast and obtained his Bachelor of Art.

Politics 
John Kweku Danso was first elected into Parliament on the ticket of the National Democratic Congress for the Sefwi-Wiawso constituency in the Western Region of Ghana during the 1992 Ghanaian General Elections. He was defeated by Isaac Kobina Nyame-Ofori in the 1996 Parliamentary primaries. He won in the general elections with 43,738 votes out of the 100% valid votes cast representing 61.90% over Kwasi Blay of the New Patriotic Party who polled 12,625 votes representing 17.90%.

Career 
Prior to being a former member of parliament for the Sefwi-Wiawso constituency in the Western Region of Ghana, he also is a teacher by profession.

Personal life 
Kweku is a Christian by faith.

References 

Living people
1944 births
National Democratic Congress (Ghana) politicians
Ghanaian Christians
Ghanaian educators
Ghanaian MPs 1993–1997
University of Cape Coast alumni
People from Western Region (Ghana)
20th-century Ghanaian politicians